The Rhode Island Kingfish was an American indoor lacrosse team based in Kingston, Rhode Island. They were a member of the North American Lacrosse League. During 2013 season the Kingfish were scheduled for a limited 6 game road schedule. Due to the Baltimore Bombers folding mid-season the Kingfish only played 4 games, and posted zero wins on the season.

History
The franchise was announced as an expansion member of the North American Lacrosse League on July 26, 2012. The Kingfish would be one of two expansion teams for the 2013 season, the other was the Baltimore Bombers

The Kingfish originally announced they would play their 2013 home schedule at the Bradford R. Boss Arena, but on January 4, 2013 the Kingfish released a statement saying, in part, "Due to an unforeseen logistical situation, the Rhode Island Kingfish will be opening the 2013 season on the road."  The rest of the NALL team also updated their schedules, with none of the teams schedules having an away game in Rhode Island.

Roster

Current Season

✝ Games canceled due to Baltimore Bombers mid-season fold.

Season-by-Season

References

External links
Rhode Island Kingfish official website
Rhode Island Kingfish official Facebook
Rhode Island Kingfish official Twitter

North American Lacrosse League teams
Lacrosse in Rhode Island
Lacrosse clubs established in 2012
2012 establishments in Rhode Island
2013 disestablishments in Rhode Island
Sports clubs disestablished in 2013